The Städelschule, Staatliche Hochschule für Bildende Künste, is a tertiary school of art in Frankfurt am Main, Germany. It accepts about 20 students each year from 500 applicants, and has a total of approximately 150 students of visual arts and 50 of architecture. About 75% of the students are not from Germany, and courses are taught in English.

History 
The Städelschule was established by the Städel Institute in 1817, following an endowment left by Johann Friedrich Städel (1728–1816), a wealthy banker and patron of the arts.  In his will he left his house, art collection and fortune in order that the Städel Institute of Art could be set up to display his art collection and to provide scholarships for poor children to receive training in architecture and art. He want them to be "...educated to become valuable and useful citizens 
and artists".

Städel died on 2 December 1816, and from 1817 scholarships were given out. It was Städel's intention only that funds should be provided to pay for students' tuition at other schools, however the institute employed its first teacher, Johann  Andreas  Benjamin  Reges (1772–1847), from 1817. He taught students in his house, and, from Summer 1817, at an orphanage. 19 students were taught in the first year. Around 1930, the Frankfurt Kunstgewerbeschule (established 1878) was incorporated into the Städelschule.

The school was later taken over by the city of Frankfurt. Until the end of 2018, the school was the only tertiary institution in Germany to be funded by a city rather than state administration. From 1 January 2019 the Städelschule became an educational institution of the state of Hesse, and it is now funded by the state, rather than the city of Frankfurt.

Faculty 

Many artists teach or have taught at the school. Among the current faculty are Willem de Rooij, Haegue Yang, Hassan Khan, and Tobias Rehberger. Max Beckmann taught at the Städelschule during the Weimar Republic, but was classed as a "degenerate artist" and dismissed from his position under the Nazi régime. His work was shown in the Degenerate Art Exhibition of 1937.

See also 
 Städel

References

External links
 

Art schools in Germany
Educational institutions established in 1817
International schools in Germany
Universities and colleges in Hesse
Städel